Robin Ian Campbell  (born September 9, 1955) is a Canadian former provincial level politician. He was elected in 2008 to represent the electoral district of West Yellowhead in the Legislative Assembly of Alberta. He was a member of the former governing Progressive Conservative caucus. He was appointed Minister of Finance and President of the Treasury board by Premier Jim Prentice on September 15, 2014.  He lost his seat to Eric Rosendahl in the May 5, 2015 provincial election that also defeated the Progressive Conservative government after 44 years in office. On November 12, he was named president of the Coal Association of Canada.

Political career
Campbell ran for a seat to the Alberta Legislature for the first time in the 2008 Alberta general election. He won his first term to represent the electoral district of West Yellowhead by a wide margin to hold it for the governing Progressive Conservative caucus.

Electoral history

References

External links
 Profile at the Legislative Assembly of Alberta

Progressive Conservative Association of Alberta MLAs
Living people
1955 births
Finance ministers of Alberta
Members of the Executive Council of Alberta
21st-century Canadian politicians